Wild West often refers to the American frontier period of the Western United States in the 19th century. 

Wild West may also refer to:

Arts, entertainment, and media

Films
(Chronological)
Wild West (serial), a 1925 film serial
Wild West, a 1946 film featuring Eddie Dean, Roscoe Ates and Lash LaRue
Wild West (film), a 1992 film starring Naveen Andrews

Games
Wild West (role-playing game), published by Fantasy Games Unlimited in 1981
The Wild West (video game), a Nintendo DS video game made by Happy Happening

Music
The Wild West (album), a 2006 album by Celly Cel
Wild West (album), a 1981 album by Dottie West
Wild West (mixtape), a 2021 mixtape by Central Cee
"Wild West", a 1986 song from Big World
"Wild West", a 2017 song by Runaway June

Television
The Wild West, a 2007 BBC documentary mini-series narrated by Michael Praed
Wild West (TV series), a 2002–2004 British TV sitcom starring Dawn French & Catherine Tate

Other uses in arts, entertainment, and media
Wild West (comics),  a Western comic book series published by Atlas Comics
Wild West Magazine, an American Old West history magazine owned by the World History Group

Wild West shows, traveling vaudeville performances in the United States and Europe
Wild Westing, the term used by Native Americans for their performances with Buffalo Bill's Wild West and similar shows

See also
Old West
Western (genre), a general designation for this category of fiction and art
Wild Wild West (disambiguation)

it:West (disambigua)